Algeria History and Civilization ( Al jazair tarikh oua hatharat) is a historical animated series from Algeria that tells the history of Algeria in 52 episodes, with an average of 26 minutes per episode, which aims to educate Algerian youth on selected history of their country until the restoration of independence from French colonial on 5 July 1962.

References

External links 
 
 

2010s Algerian television series
2010 Algerian television series debuts
Algerian animated television series
Computer-animated television series
Public Establishment of Television original programming